James E. Ross (January 23, 1921 – May 22, 1993) is a former Democratic member of the Pennsylvania State Senate, serving from 1973 to 1990. He resigned on February 28, 1990.

The James E. Ross Highway, a Pennsylvania Turnpike Commission-operated portion of Interstate 376 in Beaver County, Pennsylvania, is named for him.

References

Democratic Party Pennsylvania state senators
1993 deaths
1921 births
20th-century American politicians